The Andes Museum 1972 is located in The Old City in Montevideo, the capital city of Uruguay.
  
It is a museum on the story of the Uruguayan Air Force Flight 571 related to a plane accident that took place in the Andes in 1972 involving a group of Uruguayan rugby players, their friends and relatives that were traveling to Chile when the airplane crashed. Some of them belonged to the Old Christians rugby club. Their story on how they survived the tragedy was transmitted worldwide by means of books, documentaries, pictures and conferences and it has been an inspiration to the film Alive and many books.

The museum pays homage to the memory of the 29 people who died due to the plane accident in the Andes and to those who risked their lives to save the rest. It is a reminder of those 16 Uruguayans who came back to life after the 72 days in the Andes freezing weather conditions with no food and proper clothing. It is a private enterprise declared of cultural and turistic interest by the MEC and the Ministerio de Turismo y Deporte de Uruguay.

Hours and operation
The museum is open from Mondays to Fridays from 10 am to 5 pm and on Saturdays from 10 am to 3 pm.

Collections

The museum displays objects, realia, documents and photographs related to the Andes Tragedy in 1972.

About the visitors
Many tourists from different parts of the world visit this museum since it is an object of social studies, as documented in the museum visitor's book.  
Therefore, there is graphic and textual information in Spanish and English.

Museum store
There is a store that offers books, T-shirts and other souvenirs related to the Museum's subject matter.

See also

 Alive: The Story of the Andes Survivors
 Tinguiririca Volcano
 Francisco Domingo Abal Guerault
 Pedro Algorta
 Roberto Canessa
 Fernando Parrado
 Carlos Páez Rodríguez

References

External links

  German TV News
 TV interview in Austria on the Carrasco exhibition of the Andes Tragedy
 VTV Noticias: Museum innaguaration
 Interview with the museum director on radio Uruguay 1050 AM 12/02/14  
 Story of the Andes Survivors Museum Official Site
 Viven (trailer)
 Agenda Confidencial: Sobrevivientes de los Andes
 Museo Andes 1972, 'YouTube' website, September 9, 2014.   

Museums in Uruguay
Museums in Montevideo
Ciudad Vieja, Montevideo